The discography of Richard D. James, an Irish-born British musician, consists of six studio albums, three compilation albums, 14 extended plays, seven singles, and 12 music videos, all released under his best known alias Aphex Twin. James has also released one studio album under the alias Polygon Window, one studio album under the alias Caustic Window, and one collaborative album with Mike Paradinas. Three compilation albums and 35 extended plays were released under other aliases.

As Aphex Twin

Studio albums
{|class="wikitable plainrowheaders" style="text-align:center;"
!rowspan="2" style="width:16em"|Title
!rowspan="2" style="width:20em"|Album details
!colspan="10"|Peak chart positions
!rowspan="2" style="width:20em"|Certifications
|-
!style="width:2.5em"|UK
!style="width:2.5em"|AUS
!style="width:2.5em"|BEL
!style="width:2.5em"|FRA
!style="width:2.5em"|GER
!style="width:2.5em"|IRE
!style="width:2.5em"|JPN
!style="width:2.5em"|NOR
!style="width:2.5em"|US
!style="width:2.5em"|USDance
|-
!scope="row"| Selected Ambient Works 85–92
|
 Released: 9 November 1992
 Label: R&S
 Format: CD, CS, digital download, vinyl
| — || — || — || — || — || — || — || — || — || —
|
 BPI: Silver
|-
!scope="row"| Selected Ambient Works Volume II
|
 Released: 7 March 1994
 Label: Warp
 Format: CD, CS, digital download, vinyl
| 11 || — || — || — || — || — || — || — || — || —
|
 BPI: Silver
|-
!scope="row"| ...I Care Because You Do
|
 Released: 24 April 1995
 Label: Warp
 Format: CD, CS, digital download, vinyl
| 24 || — || — || — || — || — || — || — || — || —
|
|-
!scope="row"| Richard D. James Album
|
 Released: 4 November 1996
 Label: Warp
 Format: CD, CS, digital download, vinyl
| 62 || — || — || — || — || — || — || — || —{{efn-ua|Richard D. James Album did not enter the Billboard 200, but peaked at number 20 on the Top Heatseekers chart.}} || —
|
|-
!scope="row"| Drukqs|
 Released: 22 October 2001
 Label: Warp
 Format: CD, digital download, vinyl
| 22 || 87 || — || 43 || — || 14 || — || 36 || 154 || 6
|
 BPI: Silver
|-
!scope="row"| Syro|
 Released: 19 September 2014
 Label: Warp
 Format: CD, digital download, vinyl
| 8 || 21 || 7 || 53 || 26 || 7 || 8 || 37 || 11 || 1
|
|-
|align="center" colspan="15" style="font-size: 85%"| "—" denotes a recording that did not chart or was not released in that territory.
|}

Compilation albums

Extended plays

 Promotional album Words & Music (1994, Sire/Warner Bros. Records PRO-CD-6878). Promotional recording for Selected Ambient Works Volume II; contains edited versions of tracks from that release and portions of an interview with Richard D. James.

Singles

Music videos

Note: "Rubber Johnny" is a short film that features the song "Afx237 v.7", and "Monkey Drummer" is a short music video for the track "Mt Saint Michel + Saint Michaels Mount", both by director Chris Cunningham and both from the album Drukqs''.

As AFX

Releases under other aliases

Notes

References

External links
 Aphex Twin discography at Discogs.

Discographies of British artists
Electronic music discographies